Mgr. Pavol Lisý (born 9.2.1995, Dunajská Streda, Slovakia) was the first  professional go player certified by the European Go Federation.

Curriculum vitae 
After graduating from the Grosslingová high school, Pavel studied at the Faculty of Mathematics, Physics and Informatics at Comenius University in Bratislava. There he successfully defended first a bachelor's thesis on the topic "Cryptocurrency" and then a diploma thesis on the topic "The use of statistical modelling to predict the behaviour of mobile game players. In addition to go, he currently works as a programmer in the field of data processing.

Go career 
Pavol Lisý started playing go at the age of 5. At the age of 6, he finished his first tournament at the 2001 European Children's Championship with six wins out of six games. He studied go at home and later was taught by Miroslav Poilak 3d once a week. In 2009, he received a scholarship provided to 10 promising young players from 10 countries to study go for 3 months at the Kings Baduk School in the mountains near Beijing. He subsequently studied in Korea under the supervision of professional players Kim Sung-Rae 8p, Kim Seong-Ryong 9p and Hong Seul-Ki 7d. Lisý was promoted to amateur 6-dan  in 2012, one year later he was promoted to 7-dan amateur.

In 2014, Lisý became the first professional player certified by the European Go Federation after taking first place in the Pro Qualification Tournament in 2014. He was promoted to a 2-dan professional in 2018.

Game achievements 
 2nd place European Grand Prix final (2019)
 Master of Europe (2018)
 Master of European Professionals (2018)
 2nd Grand Slam (2018)
 The first European professional go player (2014)
 Seven-time master of Slovak Republic (2010–2014, 2017, 2020)
 Three-time European Junior Champion U20 U20 (2011,2013,2015)
 5th place místo World Amateur Go Championship, Sendai, Japan (2013)
 1st place místo Qinling Mountains Cup, Xian, China (2014)
 3th place of 2nd European Grand Slam, Berlin, Germany (2016)
 3th place of 2nd European Professional Championship, St. Petersburg, Russia (2017)
 1st place in more than 55 tournaments.

References 

1995 births
Living people
European Go players